Andrew Packer (born 16 June 1980 in Ipswich, Queensland, Australia) is a former Australian footballer.

Biography
He attended St. Josephs Nudgee College in Brisbane. He was a member of Sydney FC's Grand Final winning side in 2005–06. In 2006, he was signed in his native state by Queensland Roar. Packer announced his retirement from football at age 29 and joined the Australian Defence Force.

A-League statistics

1 – includes A-League final series statistics
2 – includes FIFA Club World Cup statistics; AFC Champions League statistics are included in season commencing after group stages (i.e. ACL and A-League seasons etc.)

Honours 
Sydney Olympic
NSL 2001–02, 2002–2003.

With Perth Glory:
 NSL: 2003–04
With Sydney FC:
 A-League Championship: 2005–06
 Oceania Club Championship: 2004–05

References

External links
 Queensland Roar profile
 Oz Football profile

1980 births
Living people
Australian soccer players
Australian expatriate soccer players
A-League Men players
League of Ireland players
Brisbane Strikers FC players
Carlton S.C. players
Cork City F.C. players
Perth Glory FC players
Sydney FC players
Sydney Olympic FC players
Brisbane Roar FC players
Sportspeople from Ipswich, Queensland
Soccer players from Queensland
Association football defenders
Expatriate association footballers in the Republic of Ireland
Australian expatriate sportspeople in Ireland
Australia youth international soccer players